Congress Center Hamburg (formerly Congress Centrum Hamburg) is a convention center in Hamburg, Germany, located right next to Planten un Blomen, near the Hamburg Dammtor station. It opened on 14 April 1973 as the first of its kind in Germany.

Capacities

See also 
 Hamburg Messe

External links 

Website of Congress Center Hamburg

Buildings and structures in Hamburg-Mitte
Convention centres in Germany
Buildings and structures completed in 1973